Lake Proserpine, which is also known as Peter Faust Dam is situated 26 kilometres inland from Proserpine, in North Queensland, Australia. Free 72hr camping is now available from October 4th, 2019.

History
Thiess was the contractor company chosen to construct the dam over the Proserpine River. Construction of the Peter Faust Dam began in May 1989 and was completed hastily in December 1990, four and a half months ahead of schedule, in time for a massive downpour which filled the dam. The dam reached a level of 98.8% in March 1991, and finally overflowed for the first time in December 2010. It reached its highest level of 1.48m above the spillway in March 2011. The dam overflowed again in March 2012, and March 2013. The dam reached its lowest level of 10.7% in 2007.

Fishing
A Stocked Impoundment Permit is required to fish in the dam.

See also

List of dams and reservoirs in Australia

References

Reservoirs in Queensland
North Queensland
Dams in Queensland